Stratos Svarnas (born 11 November 1997) is a Greek professional footballer who plays as a centre-back for Ekstraklasa club Raków Częstochowa, on loan from AEK Athens.

Career

Return to AEK Athens
On 16 August 2018, reigning Greek champions AEK Athens have re-signed Svarnas from Xanthi, by penning a five-year contract with the young international. Lacking depth in central defence with Ukrainian Dmytro Chyhrynskyi still on the sidelines, the Athenian club strengthen the squad with UEFA Champions League and Superleague commitments approaching.
On 5 February 2020, Svarnas headed Marko Livaja’s clever pass across the penalty area into the net, in a 1–1 away Greek Cup draw against Panetolikos. It was his first goal with the club in all competitions.

On 9 July 2020, Svarnas scored helping to a 2–0 home win against OFI, after a nice free-kick from Marko Livaja.

On 22 September 2020, as a reward for his solid performances, he signed a contract extension, running until the summer of 2025.

Career statistics

Club

Honours
AEK Athens
Football League: 2014–15 (South Group)
Greek Cup: 2015–16
Raków Częstochowa
Polish Super Cup: 2022

References

External links

1997 births
Living people
Greece international footballers
Greece under-21 international footballers
Greece youth international footballers
Super League Greece players
Super League Greece 2 players
Football League (Greece) players
Ekstraklasa players
AEK Athens F.C. players
Xanthi F.C. players
Raków Częstochowa players
Association football central defenders
Footballers from Athens
Greek footballers
Greek expatriate footballers
Expatriate footballers in Poland
Greek expatriate sportspeople in Poland